The 2017 National Premier Soccer League season was the 105th season of FIFA-sanctioned soccer in the United States and the 15th season of the NPSL.

Regions and conferences

Changes from 2016

Incoming teams
The following expansion clubs were announced for the 2017 NPSL season:

Moved and/or rebranded teams

Outgoing teams

Conference realignments
There were a number of conferences realigned for the 2017 season. In the South Region the South Atlantic Conference was eliminated and the South Central Conference was split into the Lone Star and Heartland Conferences. In the Midwest Region, the expanded Central Conference was renamed the North Conference and the Great Lakes East and Great Lakes West Conferences were renamed the East and Great Lakes Conferences respectively.

Personnel and sponsorship

Standings

Northeast Region

Atlantic Blue Conference

Atlantic White Conference

Atlantic White Conference top scorers

Keystone Conference

Mid-Atlantic Conference

South Region

Southeast Conference

Southeast East Division

Southeast West Division

Sunshine Conference

Lonestar Conference

Heartland Conference

Midwest Region

East Conference

Great Lakes Conference

North Conference

West Region

Northwest Conference

Golden Gate Conference

Southwest Conference

Playoffs
The format is as follows. All playoff seeding is based on points per game.
West: The top 3 teams qualify from Southwest Conference. The top 2 teams qualify from Golden Gate Conference. The top 2 teams qualify from Northwest Conference. The top remaining team based on points per game in the region qualifies as a wildcard. The 3 conference champions are seeded 1-3. The wildcard team is seeded 8. The remaining teams are seeded 4-7. Each game will be hosted by the higher seed.
Midwest: The top 2 teams from each conference qualify. The 3 conference champions are seeded 1-3. The 3 remaining teams are seeded 4-6. The region quarterfinals will be hosted by the higher seed. The semifinal and final will be a site to be determined.
South: The 4 conference champions will be seeded based on points per game. Each game will be hosted by higher seed.
Heartland: The top 4 teams qualify and each game is hosted by higher seed.
Lone Star: The top 4 teams qualify and each game is hosted by higher seed.
Southeast: The top 3 teams from each division qualify. Each game is hosted by higher seed.
Sunshine: The top team qualifies directly to the region playoffs.
Northeast: The 4 conference champions will be seeded based on points per game. Each game will be hosted by higher seed.
Atlantic Blue: The top 3 teams qualify and each game is hosted by higher seed.
Atlantic White: The top 3 teams qualify and each game is hosted by higher seed.
Keystone: The top 4 teams qualify and each game is hosted by higher seed.
Mid-Atlantic: All 4 teams qualify and are seeded based on the first 6 games of the regular season. Each game is hosted by higher seed.

Heartland Conference Playoffs

Bold = winner* = after extra time, = penalty shootout score

Lone Star Conference Playoffs

Bold = winner* = after extra time, = penalty shootout score

Southeast Conference Playoffs

Bold = winner* = after extra time, = penalty shootout score

Atlantic Blue Conference Playoffs

Bold = winner* = after extra time, = penalty shootout score

Atlantic White Conference Playoffs

Bold = winner* = after extra time, = penalty shootout score

Keystone Conference Playoffs

Bold = winner* = after extra time, = penalty shootout score

Mid-Atlantic Conference Playoffs

Bold = winner* = after extra time, = penalty shootout score

Regional and National Playoffs

Bold = winner

* = after extra time, = penalty shootout score

References

 
2017